The 2017–18 Coupe de France preliminary rounds, Paris-Île-de-France make up the qualifying competition to decide which teams from the Paris-Île-de-France region teams take part in the main competition from the seventh round.

First round 
The matches in Paris-Île-de-France were played between 7 May and 31 May 2017. Tiers shown reflect the 2016–17 season.

First round results: Paris-Île-de-France

Second round 
These matches are scheduled to be played between 4 June and 27 August 2017. Tiers shown reflect the 2016–17 season.

Second round results: Paris-Île-de-France

Third round 
These matches were played on 10 September 2017.

Third round results: Paris-Île-de-France

Fourth round 
These matches were played on 23 and 24 September 2017.

Fourth round results: Paris-Île-de-France

Fifth round 
These matches were played on 7, 8 and 15 October 2017.

Fifth round results: Paris-Île-de-France

Sixth round 
These matches were played on 21 and 22 October 2017.

Sixth round results: Paris-Île-de-France

Notes

References 

2017–18 Coupe de France